Ishikari Plain is a plain in western Hokkaido. The area of the plain is approximately 3800km. The central city is Sapporo. Rice cultivation is very popular in the Ishikari Plain.

References 

Plains of Japan
Landforms of Hokkaido